Nampa is the largest city in Canyon County, Idaho, United States. Its population was 100,200 at the time of the 2020 Census. It is Idaho's third-most populous city. It is the second principal city of the Boise metropolitan area. The name "Nampa" may have come from a Shoshoni word meaning either moccasin or footprint. According to toponymist William O. Bright the name comes from the Shoshoni word /nampai/, meaning "foot".

History
Nampa had its beginnings in the early 1880s when the Oregon Short Line Railroad built a line from Granger, Wyoming, to Huntington, Oregon, which passed through Nampa. In Nampa there is a history museum marking the significance of the railroad company.  More railroad lines sprang up running through Nampa, making it a very important railroad town. Alexander and Hannah Duffes established one of the town's first homesteads, eventually forming the Nampa Land and Improvement Company with the help of their friend and co-founder, James McGee. In spite of the name, many of the first settlers referred to the town as "New Jerusalem" because of the strong religious focus of its citizens. After only a year the town had grown from 15 homes to 50. As new amenities were added to the town, Nampa continued its growth and was incorporated in 1891.

Unlike most towns in that historic era with streets running true north and south, Nampa's historic roads run perpendicular to the railroad tracks that travel northwest to southeast through the town. Thus, the northside is really the northeast side of the tracks, and the southside is really the southwest side of the railroad tracks. Founder Alexander Duffes laid out Nampa's streets this way to prevent an accident like one that occurred earlier in a town he had platted near Toronto, Ontario, Canada. In that town, a woman and her two children were killed by a train when they started across the railroad tracks in a buggy and the wheel got stuck. As the Oregon Short Line railroad originally bypassed Boise, Nampa has the fanciest of many railroad depots built in the area.

The first elementary school was built in the 1890s. Lakeview School was on a hill on 6th Street and 12th Avenue North, with a view of Lake Ethel. Just after the school's centennial celebration, it was condemned as a school and sold to the First Mennonite Church. In 2008 the building was refurbished, and is now being used by the Idaho Arts Charter School.

Lake Ethel – an irrigation reservoir – had long been the site of community picnics, and many citizens fished, swam, boated and even hunted on the lake and its surrounding property. The hunting didn't last for long, however, as O.F. Persons, owner of the adjoining homestead, took offense when local hunters started shooting his pet ducks.

The city later auctioned off the lake. E.H. Dewey (a former Nampa mayor) was the only bidder. But occasional flooding led to a series of lawsuits from neighbors. Dewey eventually drained Lake Ethel. Not long after, the city council became interested in buying back the Fritz Miller property as well as the Dewey home. Pressure had been building for more than four years. Nampa citizens wanted another park. On August 7, 1924, the city council passed an ordinance to purchase the Miller property and name it Lakeview Park. A bandstand was completed in 1928, and the municipal swimming pool opened on August 13, 1934. Swim tickets cost 10 cents each or 15 for a dollar. It is Nampa's largest park and many community celebrations are held there.

Colonel William H. Dewey, a man who made a fortune mining in Silver City, built the Dewey Palace Hotel in 1902 for a quarter of a million dollars. Colonel Dewey died in his hotel in 1903, leaving his son one million dollars. The hotel survived the great fire of 1909, which burned several blocks of downtown Nampa, but was razed in 1963 after redevelopment plans failed. Relics from the hotel, such as the chandelier and the hotel safe can be found at the Canyon County Historical Museum, which is housed in the old train depot on Front Street and Nampa City Hall. After demolition the location on First Street between 11th and 12th Ave. South was sold to private enterprise including a bank and tire store replacing this historic building with the current modern structures. A public-use postage stamp sized park was later placed across the street from the old palace property as a collaboration between the Downtown Alliance of Nampa (the local business council) and an Eagle Scout Project for the Boy Scouts of America. The park includes a large mural/wall sculpture of running horses commissioned for the project.

A Carnegie library was built downtown in 1908; it burned down after the library moved in 1966. Nampa Public Library was then located on the corner of 1st Street and 11th Avenue South in the old bank building. A new library, located on 12th Avenue South, was opened in March 2015.

Deer Flat Reservoir, an offstream irrigation storage reservoir, was constructed by the United States Bureau of Reclamation between 1906 and 1911. Known locally as Lake Lowell, it is surrounded by the Deer Flat National Wildlife Refuge, which was established in 1909 by President Theodore Roosevelt. The refuge is administered by the U.S. Fish and Wildlife Service. Lake Lowell is filled by the concrete New York Canal; the water is diverted from the Boise River a few miles below Lucky Peak Dam.

The Idaho State School and Hospital was built northwest of Nampa in 1910, for the state's developmentally challenged population, and opened in 1918. The institution was largely self-sufficient, with a large farm staffed by the residents. The higher-functioning residents also cared for residents who could not care for themselves. Much has changed in the care of persons with developmental disabilities from the time of the state school's opening. The land for the old farm was sold and are now golf courses (Centennial and Ridgecrest), and the residents no longer give primary care to other residents. The institution is modernized and remains in operation, though a few of the oldest buildings are now used to house juvenile offenders.

Nampa held an annual harvest festival and farmers' market from about 1908, a time of celebration and community fun. From this festival emerged the Snake River Stampede Rodeo in 1937, which continues to this day. It is one of the top 12 rodeos in the pro rodeo circuits.

A local congregation of the Church of the Nazarene built a small elementary school in 1913, later growing to Northwest Nazarene College in 1915 and finally to Northwest Nazarene University. The university currently has a student body of 2,500 undergraduate and graduate students.

Karcher Mall opened in 1965, the first enclosed shopping mall in the Treasure Valley. Many area residents have memories of having an Orange Julius, sitting on Santa's lap, or playing games at the Red Baron arcade in the mall. Karcher Mall was "the place to gather" for several decades until the Boise Towne Square mall was built in Boise in 1988, drawing business away. Karcher Mall struggled for many years, but is making a comeback. With a new I-84 interchange nearby, the area is booming with new business.

The Idaho Press-Tribune is the local newspaper for the Canyon County area. Since early 2009, the facility has been the contract printer for The Idaho Statesman, whose antiquated press equipment was retired and not replaced.

Geography
Nampa is located at  (43.574807, -116.563559).

ZIP codes: 83651, 83653, 83686, 83687.

Demographics

2020 census

Population 
As of the census of 2020 there were 100,200 people. The population density was 2,992.7 inhabitants per square mile. The racial makeup of the city was 81.2% White, 0.6% Black or African American alone, 1.0% American Indian or Alaskan Native alone, 0.9% Asian alone, 0.4% Native Hawaiian or Pacific Islander alone, 5.6% two or more races, 24.8% Hispanic or Latino. 69.6% of people identified as White alone, not Hispanic or Latino. The median age was 33 years old. 6.6% of residents were under 5 years of age, 25.8% were under 18 years, 14.6% were over 65 years, and 49.8% were female.

Households 
There were 34,164 households, with 2.78 persons per households in the city. The owner-occupies housing rate was 66.3% and the median value of an owner-occupied unit was $191,800. 78.4% lived in the same household as of a year ago. In 17.6% of households, language other than English was spoken at home.

Educational attainment 
87.2% of people were high school graduates (diploma or equivalent), 4.9% of people had less a 9th grade education and 7.9% had a 9th-12th grade education with no diploma. 19.9% had a bachelor's degree, and 5.9% had a graduate or professional degree. 

The percentage of people who graduated high school (diploma or equivalent) by racial makeup: 91% White, 94.9% Black, 75.2% American Indian or Alaska Native, 75.6% Asian, 88.1% Native Hawaiian or Pacific Islander, 91.3% Two or more races, and 66.7% Hispanic or Latino Origin.

21.2% of people with less than a high school diploma (or equivalent) lived in poverty. 12.6% of high school graduates lived in poverty, and 4.0% of bachelor's degree holders lived in poverty.

Income, employment, business, and health 
Household 12-month income was $53,205 and per capital income was $22,422. 63.5% of residents were in the workforce (age 16 and above). 57.0% of the female population were in the civilian workforce (age 16 and above). 13.9% of residents lived in poverty.The mean travel time to work (commute) was 23.4 minutes. As of 2017, there were 1,833 businesses with 939 being owned by men and 212 owned by women. 

11.4% of people had a disability and 13.8% of people under the age of 65 did not have health insurance.

2010 census 

As of the census of 2010, there were 81,557 people, 27,729 households, and 20,016 families living in the city. The racial makeup of the city was 82.9% White, 0.7% African American, 1.2% Native American, 0.9% Asian, 0.4% Pacific Islander, 10.7% from other races, and 3.2% from two or more races. Hispanic or Latino of any race were 22.9% of the population.

There were 27,729 households, of which 44.0% had children under the age of 18 living with them, 52.7% were married couples living together, 13.5% had a female householder with no husband present, 5.9% had a male householder with no wife present, and 27.8% were non-families. 22.0% of all households were made up of individuals, and 8.7% had someone living alone who was 65 years of age or older. The average household size was 2.88 and the average family size was 3.36.

The median age in the city was 30.1 years. 32.3% of residents were under the age of 18; 9.8% were between the ages of 18 and 24; 28.6% were from 25 to 44; 18.8% were from 45 to 64; and 10.3% were 65 years of age or older. The city's gender makeup was 49.0% male and 51.0% female.

2000 census
As of the census of 2000, there were 51,867 people, 18,090 households, and 13,024 families living in the city. The city's racial makeup was 83.45% White, 0.40% African American, 0.94% Native American, 0.93% Asian, 0.18% Pacific Islander, 11.25% from other races, and 2.86% from two or more races. Hispanic or Latino of any race were 17.90% of the population.

There were 18,090 households, of which 40.6% had children under the age of 18 living with them, 55.6% were married couples living together, 11.4% had a female householder with no husband present, and 28.0% were non-families. 22.6% of all households were made up of individuals, and 9.6% had someone living alone who was 65 years of age or older. The average household size was 2.77 and the average family size was 3.25.

The city's population was spread out, with 31.0% under the age of 18, 12.5% from 18 to 24, 30.3% from 25 to 44, 15.0% from 45 to 64, and 11.2% who were 65 years of age or older. The median age was 28 years. For every 100 females, there were 96.0 males. For every 100 females age 18 and over, there were 93.0 males.

The city's median household income was $34,758, and the median family income was $39,434. Males had a median income of $28,580 versus $22,022 for females. The city's per capita income was $14,491. About 8.7% of families and 12.4% of the population were below the poverty line, including 13.7% of those under age 18 and 9.9% of those age 65 or over.

Arts and culture

Ford Idaho Center 
The Ford Idaho Center is a city-owned complex of entertainment venues managed by Spectra Venue Management. Venues include a 10,500-capacity amphitheater built in 1998 that features a 60-by-40-foot stage; a 12,279-seat arena featuring  of arena floor space; the Idaho Horse Park, used for horse shows; and the Sports Center, used for indoor horse shows in the summer, and track and field events, including the home meets of the Boise State University Broncos track teams, in the winter. The Idaho Center hosts the Snake River Stampede Rodeo, Monster Jam, music concerts, trade shows, sporting events, and other events.

Brandt Center 
Northwest Nazarene University's Brandt Center has a 1,500 seat auditorium, two art galleries, multiple meeting spaces, and a 9,000 square-foot lobby. Art, music, dance, theater, speakers, and other events are hosted here.

Civic Center 
The Nampa Civic Center hosts theater, music, films, and other events. It includes the 640-seat John Brandt Performing Arts Theater.

Hispanic Cultural Center of Idaho 
The Hispanic Cultural Center of Idaho (HCCI) opened in September 2003. The center hosts events, classes, and festivals including Día de los Muertos, Hispanic Heritage Month, and Día Internacional de la Mujer y. It serves as a meeting place for associations and groups. Displays of cultural history are available to the public.

Nampa Train Depot Museum 
The Nampa Train Depot Museum is a historical depot with displays and archives of the area's railroad and cultural history. The Canyon County Historical Society saved the depot from demolition in 1972.

Annual Festival of the Arts 
This festival is held in Lakeview Park every year and includes art, music, dance, and food. They celebrated their 34th event in 2021.

Warhawk Air Museum 
The Warhawk Air Museum was established in 1986 and relocated to Nampa in 2001. The museum displays aircraft and veterans' history. Their collection includes a P-51C Mustang, P-40N Warhawk, F-86F Sabre Jet, N3N, Fokker DR-1, UH-1C Huey, L-19 Bird Dog, MiG-17, MiG-21, F-104 Starfighter, and a F9F Panther Jet.

Farmer's Market 
The weekly Nampa Farmer's Market started in 1989 and runs from April to October in Lloyd Square. It includes over 100 regional vendors from within a 100-hundred miles radius.

Parks and recreation 
Nampa has 27 parks and 14 miles of pedestrian pathways.

Lakeview Park is the largest (44 acres) and includes a public swimming pool, 1,000 seat capacity amphitheater, baseball-softball fields, BMX track, rose garden, basketball courts, playground, duck pond, sand volleyball court, horseshoe pits, and water wise garden. Historic displays at the park include a Northrop F-89B Scorpion fighter jet, M-60 Tank, and a Union Pacific Engine No. 616, a class 2-8-0 locomotive.

The Nampa Recreation Center, a  facility with a six-pool aquatic center, three gymnasiums, racquetball courts, indoor walking/running track, a weight room and exercise equipment, a climbing wall, and other activity areas, opened in 1994. 

The City of Nampa owns and operates the Centennial Golf Course (18 holes) and Ridgecrest Golf Club (27 holes). The city also owns and operates the Kohlerlawn-Cemetery.

Wilson Springs is a 55-acre nature area that includes trails and fishing ponds serviced by Idaho Fish and Game and Canyon County Parks.

Government
On January 2, 2018, and then again on January 3, 2022, Debbie Kling was sworn in as the second female mayor of Nampa. Current Nampa City Council members are Victor Rodriguez (Seat 1, elected 2017 and re-elected 2021), Darl Bruner (Seat 2, reelected 2019), Natalie Jangula (Seat 3, elected 2021), Darl Reynolds (Seat 4, appointed 2022), Randy Haverfield (Seat 5, reelected 2017 and 2021) and Jacob Bower (Seat 6, elected 2019).

The Nampa City Council increased from four to six members after voters approved the increase in May 2013.

Education

K-12 
The Nampa School District includes 18 elementary schools, five middle schools, and four high schools, and one alternative high school that serves students who struggle in traditional high schools. The high schools include Nampa High School (the original and oldest), Skyview High School, Columbia High School, and Union High School.

Vallivue School District is partly in Nampa and partly in Caldwell, Idaho. It has seven elementary schools, two middle schools, and two high schools (one in Nampa).

Post-secondary 
College of Western Idaho (CWI) is a public, 2-year community college offering Associate Degrees and Technical Certificates. It was established in 2007. The college is accredited by the Northwest Commission on Colleges and Universities (NWCCU) and it serves approximately 10,000 students.

Northwest Nazarene University (NNU) is a private Christian university located in Nampa. It was originally established in 1913 as a grade school and Bible school, but was later established as a four-year degree institution in 1937. It is accredited by the Northwest Commission on Colleges and Universities (NWCCU) and it serves approximately 2,000 students total.

Infrastructure

Transportation
Major thoroughfares includes Interstate 84, which has four exits into Nampa, State Highway 55, and State Highway 45. Principal roads include the Nampa-Caldwell Boulevard (which connects Nampa with Caldwell), 12th Avenue Road, 16th Avenue, and Garrity Boulevard. The Union Pacific Northwest Corridor railroad line, connecting Salt Lake City and points east with the Pacific Northwest, runs through Nampa. Public bus transportation includes several bus lines operated by ValleyRide. Private bus transportation includes a single Greyhound bus stop. The Nampa Municipal Airport is used for general aviation.

Notable people
 
George L. Bartlett, U.S. Marine Corps Brigadier general and veteran of three wars
Ronee Blakley, actress, singer-songwriter, known for her role in Nashville
Bud Clark, mayor of Portland, Oregon
Dolores Crow (1931–2018), politician and legislator lived in Nampa and represented its district
Henry Hajimu Fujii, farmer, Japanese-American spokesman, lapidary
Davey Hamilton, race car driver, competed in Indianapolis 500
Larry Jackson, Major League Baseball pitcher (1955–68)
Mark Lindsay, lead vocalist of rock band Paul Revere and the Raiders
Zack Lively, actor
Rob Morris, former NFL linebacker for Indianapolis Colts
 Don Mossi, Major League Baseball pitcher for several teams.
Gracie Pfost, former U.S. representative; first woman to represent Idaho in Congress
Jake Pitts, musician. guitar player, Black Veil Brides
Steve Symms, former U.S. senator
Ted Trueblood, outdoor writer, Idaho conservation leader, editor of Field & Stream magazine
Edwin P. Wilson (1928–2012), CIA agent convicted of arms trading
Julie Yamamoto, educator and member of the Idaho House of Representatives

See also
 Amalgamated Sugar Company

References

External links

 Official City of Nampa website
 Nampa Chamber of Commerce

 
Cities in Idaho
Cities in Canyon County, Idaho
Populated places established in 1886
Boise metropolitan area
Idaho placenames of Native American origin